According to Seder Olam Zuta, Jehoshaphat ( Yəhōšāp̄āṭ, "Yahweh has judged") was a High Priest of Israel, succeeding Jehoiarib and succeeded by Jehoiada. 

However, the historian Josephus does not mention a Jehoshaphat, and according to his account, the second High Priest after Joram (the chronological place of Jehoshaphat) was Pediah.

References

9th-century BCE High Priests of Israel